The 2005 Meath Senior Football Championship was the 113th edition of the Meath GAA's premier club Gaelic football tournament for senior graded teams in County Meath, Ireland. The tournament consists of 16 teams, with the winner going on to represent Meath in the Leinster Senior Club Football Championship. The championship starts with a group stage and then progresses to a knock out stage.

The Knock-Out stages of the Championship were surrounded by controversy as Navan O'Mahonysl, were expelled from the Championship due to the use of an extra substitute in extra-time of the semi final. The game started in controversy too as Dunboyne had full forward Robbie Brennan sent off in contested circumstances after 5 minutes following a clash with Meath player Kevin Reilly.  Having missed a first half penalty, 14 man Dunboyne led at the end of regular time but a last minute point in injury time put the game into extra time. Having 14 men for the whole semi final appeared to catch up with Dunboyne and O Mahony's ran out winners by 2 points in an ill tempered game. However having used 2 subs in normal time, the Navan club were permitted to use 3 more in extra-time but used 4. What was more galling for the Navan club was the fact that the illegal player failed to even touch the ball late on in their two-point win. Having been advised by the Meath County board officials of the infraction at the game, Dunboyne left the decision to the Meath County Board who then asked Dunboyne to offer a replay following a campaign from the O'Mahony's club. O'Mahonys appealed their expulsion to the Meath County Board and later to the Leinster Council. On 6 October 2005, the GAA's Disputes Resolution Authority (DRA) upheld the ruling of both boards after a 4 hour meeting at Navan's Ardboyne Hotel.
Navan O'Mahonys, who themselves lost twice in the group stages earlier, were left with the unique achievement of being the only club to beat the eventual champions twice in the one campaign.  
 
Skryne were the defending champions after they defeated Simonstown Gaels in the previous years final.

Wolfe Tones were promoted after claiming the 2004 Meath Intermediate Football Championship title, their first Intermediate win.

On 9 October 2005, St. Peter's Dunboyne claimed their 2nd Senior Championship title when they defeated Blackhall Gaels 1-8 to 0-8 in a keenly fought local derby game. Denis Gallagher raised the Keegan Cup for Dunboyne while Ger Robinson claimed the 'Man of the Match' award.

Dunderry were relegated after 15 years in the senior grade.

Team changes
The following teams have changed division since the 2004 championship season.

To S.F.C.
Promoted from I.F.C.
 Wolfe Tones  -  (Intermediate Champions)

From S.F.C.
Relegated to I.F.C.
 Gaeil Colmcille

Group stage
There are 2 groups called Group A and B. The 4 top finishers in Group A and B will qualify for the quarter finals. The 2 teams that finish last in their groups will play in a relegation play off.

Group A

Round 1:
 Navan O'Mahonys 1-8, 0-5 St. Peter's Dunboyne, Dunsany,
 Trim 0-8, 0-7 Summerhill, Longwood,
 Blackhall Gaels 2-10, 1-5 Cortown, Pairc Tailteann,
 Dunderry 0-8, 0-7 Ballinlough, Pairc Tailteann,

Round 2:
 St. Peter's Dunboyne 1-16, 0-8 Ballinlough, Trim,
 Trim 1-9, 0-3 Navan O'Mahonys, Dunsany,
 Blackhall Gaels 0-13, 0-10 Summerhill, Longwood,
 Cortown 2-7, 0-9 Dunderry, Bohermeen,

Round 3:
 St. Peter's Dunboyne 3-11, 2-7 Cortown, Skryne,
 Navan O'Mahonys 0-9, 0-5 Ballinlough, Kells,
 Trim 2-8, 0-5 Blackhall Gaels, Summerhill,
 Summerhill 3-12, 0-7 Dunderry, Boardsmill,

Round 4:
 St. Peter's Dunboyne 2-10, 1-6 Summerhill, Dunsany,
 Blackhall Gaels 1-9, 0-11 Navan O'Mahonys, Pairc Tailteann,
 Trim 0-11, 0-8 Dunderry, Dunshaughlin,
 Ballinlough 1-10, 0-10 Cortown, Kells,

Round 5:
 St. Peter's Dunboyne 1-9, 2-6 Trim, Pairc Tailteann,
 Navan O'Mahonys 1-11, 0-6 Cortown, Kells,
 Blackhall Gaels 4-7, 0-13 Dunderry, Dunsany,
 Summerhill 2-12, 1-5 Ballinlough, Athboy,

Round 6:
 Blackhall Gaels 0-13, 1-9 St. Peter's Dunboyne, Dunsany,
 Navan O'Mahonys 0-12, 0-8 Dunderry, Pairc Tailteann,
 Trim 0-12, 0-4 Ballinlough, Kells,
 Summerhill 1-14, 0-6 Cortown, Boardsmill,

Round 7:
 St. Peter's Dunboyne 0-15, 0-3 Dunderry, Dunshaughlin,
 Navan O'Mahonys 1-14, 0-10 Summerhill, Dunsany,
 Trim 2-15, 0-6 Cortown, Kildalkey,
 Blackhall Gaels 2-10, 1-3 Ballinlough, Simonstown,

Group B

Round 1:
 Simonstown Gaels 1-9, 0-12 Seneschalstown, Pairc Tailteann,
 Wolfe Tones 3-11, 0-14 Walterstown, Pairc Tailteann,
 St. Patrick's 1-9, 1-6 Skryne, Ratoath,
 Dunshaughlin 1-10, 1-3 Kilmainhamwood, Pairc Tailteann,

Round 2:
 St. Patrick's 1-10, 1-10 Dunshaughlin, Ratoath,
 Wolfe Tones 2-5, 0-10 Skryne, Walterstown,
 Walterstown 1-12, 0-7 Simonstown Gaels, Seneschalstown,
 Seneschalstown 1-14, 0-10 Kilmainhamwood,

Round 3:
 St. Patrick's 5-14, 2-9 Seneschalstown,
 Skryne 1-12, 1-8 Dunshaughlin, Pairc Tailteann,
 Simonstown Gaels 3-15, 2-11 Wolfe Tones,
 Walterstown 0-14, 0-10 Kilmainhamwood,

Round 4:
 St. Patrick's 2-9, 1-12 Walterstown,
 Kilmainhamwood 2-8, 1-9 Simonstown Gaels, Castletown,
 Wolfe Tones 2-11, 1-9 Dunshaughlin, Pairc Tailteann,
 Skryne 3-8, 1-8 Seneschalstown, Pairc Tailteann,

Round 5:
 Simonstown Gaels 1-11, 1-8 St. Patrick's, Ratoath,
 Dunshaughlin 2-14, 0-3 Seneschalstown, Skryne,
 Wolfe Tones 0-14, 2-4 Kilmainhamwood, Carlanstown,
 Walterstown 0-13, 0-5 Skryne,

Round 6:
 St. Patrick's 0-9, 0-8 Kilmainhamwood,
 Dunshaughlin 2-11, 0-12 Walterstown, Pairc Tailteann,
 Simonstown Gaels 3-13, 1-10 Skryne, Pairc Tailteann,
 Seneschalstown 1-13, 0-11 Wolfe Tones, Simonstown,

Round 7:
 St. Patrick's 1-13, 1-12 Wolfe Tones,
 Seneschalstown 1-13, 0-15 Walterstown,
 Simonstown Gaels 1-13, 1-7 Dunshaughlin, Pairc Tailteann,
 Skryne 2-12, 1-10 Kilmainhamwood, Seneschalstown,

Knock-out Stage

Relegation Play Off
In Group A, 3 teams finished on equal points with each team beating each other in head-to-head results. To decide who would play Kilmainhamwood (Bottom Group B) in the Relegation Final, a Preliminary Relegation Play Off was played between Cortown, Ballinlough and Dunderry.

Preliminary Relegation Play Off:
 Cortown 2-5, 1-2 Ballinlough, Kells, 25/9/2005,
 Ballinlough 2-8, 0-13 Dunderry, Athboy, 23/10/2005, (A.E.T.)

Relegation Final:
 Kilmainhamwood 0-8, 0-3 Dunderry, Kells, 30/10/2005,

Finals

Quarter-final
 St. Peter's Dunboyne 1-13, 0-9 St. Patrick's, Ratoath, 10/9/2005,
 Blackhall Gaels 0-14, 0-12 Wolfe Tones, Pairc Tailteann, 10/9/2005,
 Navan O'Mahonys 1-11, 1-8 Simonstown Gaels, Pairc Tailteann, 11/9/2005,
 Trim 2-11, 0-10 Dunshaughlin, Pairc Tailteann, (A.E.T.) 11/9/2005,

Semi-final
 Blackhall Gaels 1-10, 0-5 Trim, Pairc Tailteann, 17/9/2005,
 Navan O'Mahonys 1-14, 1-12 St. Peter's Dunboyne, Pairc Tailteann, 18/9/2005, (A.E.T.)  

Final:
 St. Peter's Dunboyne 1-8, 0-8 Blackhall Gaels, Pairc Tailteann, 9/10/2006,

 Although Navan O'Mahonys defeated St. Peter's Dunboyne in their Semi-final, they were expelled from the Championship due to the use of an extra substitute in extra-time.

References

External links

Meath Senior Football Championship
Meath Senior Football Championship